Jesse Parahi (born 29 July 1989) is an Australian rugby union player. He made his international debut at the 2010 Edinburgh Sevens.

In November 2015 Parahi briefly left the Australian sevens team to play for Wests Tigers in the NRL. After eight months in rugby league he decided to switch back to rugby sevens and rejoined the team for the 2016 Paris Sevens.

Parahi was named in Australia's sevens squad for the 2016 Summer Olympics.

Parahi is of New Zealand Māori descent, and affiliates with the Ngāti Kahungunu iwi (tribe).

Parahi and his wife Carlien run an occupational therapy program - Sense Rugby - created to help kids who usually find it difficult to be part of a sports team get involved in sport and physical activity. www.senserugby.com.au

References

External links 
 
 Australia Sevens Profile
 Australian Olympic Profile
 
 

1989 births
Living people
Australian rugby union players
Australia international rugby sevens players
Australian people of Māori descent
Rugby sevens players at the 2016 Summer Olympics
Olympic rugby sevens players of Australia